The Iron Mountain Micropolitan Statistical Area, as defined by the United States Census Bureau, is an area consisting of two counties – one in Michigan and one in Wisconsin – anchored by the city of Iron Mountain, Michigan. As of the 2000 census, the μSA had a population of 32,560 (though a July 1, 2009 estimate placed the population at 31,245).

Counties
Dickinson County, Michigan
Florence County, Wisconsin

Communities

Cities
Iron Mountain, Michigan (Principal city)
Kingsford, Michigan
Norway, Michigan

Census-designated places
Note: All census-designated places are unincorporated.

Florence, Wisconsin
Quinnesec, Michigan

Unincorporated places
Alfred, Michigan
Channing, Michigan
East Kingsford, Michigan
Felch, Michigan
Felch Mountain, Michigan
Floodwood, Michigan
Foster City, Michigan
Granite Bluff, Michigan
Hardwood, Michigan
Hylas, Michigan
Loretto, Michigan
Merriman, Michigan
Metropolitan, Michigan
Ralph, Michigan
Randville, Michigan
Sagola, Michigan
Skidmore, Michigan
Spread Eagle, Wisconsin
Theodore, Michigan
Vulcan, Michigan
Waucedah, Michigan

Townships/Towns

Dickinson County Townships

Florence County Towns

Demographics
As of the census of 2000, there were 32,560 people, 13,519 households, and 9,024 families residing within the μSA. The racial makeup of the μSA was 97.99% White, 0.12% African American, 0.50% Native American, 0.38% Asian, 0.03% Pacific Islander, 0.14% from other races, and 0.84% from two or more races. Hispanic or Latino of any race were 0.64% of the population.

The median income for a household in the μSA was $34,788, and the median income for a family was $41,931. Males had a median income of $33,682 versus $21,725 for females. The per capita income for the μSA was $21,725.

See also
Michigan census statistical areas
Wisconsin census statistical areas

References

 
Dickinson County, Michigan
Geography of Florence County, Wisconsin
Metropolitan areas of Michigan
Metropolitan areas of Wisconsin